Zoltán Decleva (30 July 188717 July 1950) was a Hungarian military officer, who served as commander of the Hungarian Third Army during the Second World War.

He commanded the Hungarian I Corps during the Invasion of Yugoslavia. 
In 1941, he was deputy chief of General Staff (May–October) and deputy commander in chief of the Army (November). 
Between 1 November 1941 and 3 December 1942, he commanded the 3rd Army, which occupied a part of Yugoslavia.

He retired on 1 February 1943.

Biography 
Zoltán was born on 30 July 1887 in Alsószemeréd (now Dolné Semerovce) in province of Lower Austria, Austria-Hungary (now Slovakia). Raised into an impoverished noble family, whose origins goes back to Joannes Decleva, illegitimate son of John II, Duke of Cleves and a Hungarian jewish women.

After he graduated in Defense Force Academy of Pécs, he served in 1906 at 19º Regiment of Infantry of Army in Pécs. At the First World War, during forty months, he fought at the front.

He got a morganatic marriage with the Archduchess Elisabeth Henriette of Austria (1883-1958), sister of Archduke Joseph August of Austria, Regent of Hungary from August 1919 to August 1919. His wife had a sympathetic view about the invasion of Hungary by the nazis; she died in 1958 in Regensburg, in West Germany, at the age of 74 - there is any mention about Zoltán on her grave.

In 1923 he graduated in Military Academy of Budapest. From 15 November 1927 to 1 May 1931, he was assistant of Chief-Commandant of Defense Army. On 1 August 1933 he became chief of 1st Hungarian Brigade. In 1936 he was nominated chief of Departament of Ministry of Defense. He also was Vice Chief of Defence Staff since 1 November de 1938, in January of the same year, he was promoted to Major-General and on 1 September  1940 to Lieutenant-General .
In March 1940 he became commander of the Hungarian I Corps, with which he participated in the annexation of Northern Transylvania in September 1940 and at the Invasion of Yugoslavia on 5 April 1941. After the occupation of Yugoslavia, he became Deputy Chief General Staff between May and November 1941 and was then appointed Commander of the Hungarian Third Army, which occupied the Hungarian sector of Yugoslavia, until December 1942.

He was nominated General Secretary on 1 October 1942. On 17 December 1943 he was nominated a Private Royal Counsellor of Royal Council of Miklós Horthy,  Regent of Hungary from 1920 to 1944. In March 1944 he was condecorated with the Cross of Hungarian Order of Merit. His son László, after the abdication of Miklós Horthy, whom he supported, went into  exile in Portugal and later to Brazil. Zoltán's illegitimate son, Ferenc Vitéz Decleva (1942-2016), became Capitan of Baranya County, Colonel of the Hungarian National Guard and a member of Knights of Saint George.

Zoltán Decleva died on 17 July 1950 in Budapest. At 2004, he was graced posthumously with an Order of Vitéz.

References

Notes

This article is based on a translation of the equivalent article of the Hungarian Wikipedia

External links
 Magyar Életrajzi Lexikon
 Vitézi Rend
 II. világháború - tények, képek, adatok
 Generals.dk
 Zoltán Decleva (1887-1950)
 Biography of Colonel-general Decleva, Zoltán
 Ferenc Vitéz Decleva (son of Zoltán)
 Commemoration of 55º anniversary of the end of Hungarian Revolution of 1956 (presided by Ferenc Decleva)

1887 births
1950 deaths
Hungarian soldiers
Hungarian military personnel of World War II